L'essentiel is a francophone, free daily newspaper in Luxembourg.

History and profile
L'essentiel was established in 2007 and is published in French. It is published by Edita SA: a joint venture between Switzerland's Tamedia and Luxembourg-based Editpress.It covers all essential news of Luxembourg, economy, sports & global.

References

External links
 L'essentiel official website 
 L'essentiel official website (German)
 vomu.org

Daily newspapers published in Luxembourg
Publications established in 2007
2007 establishments in Luxembourg
French-language newspapers published in Luxembourg
Free daily newspapers